Mount Batok is a cinder cone located in East Java, Indonesia. The location of Mount Batok is west from Mount Bromo. This mountain is one of the inactive volcanoes located within the Tengger caldera. Mount Batok is part of Bromo Tengger Semeru National Park.

Etymology 
In Javanese, batok means "coconut shell". The Tenggerese people believe that Mount Batok was formed from a coconut shell which was kicked by Resi Bima, a powerful giant, after failing to fulfill the conditions proposed by Rara Anteng to marry her.

See also 

 Mount Bromo
 Bromo Tengger Semeru National Park
 Volcanology of Java
 List of volcanoes in Indonesia

References

External links 
Picture Gallery with Mount Batok

Stratovolcanoes of Indonesia
Subduction volcanoes
Volcanoes of East Java
Batok
Cultural Properties of Indonesia in East Java
Cinder cones
Volcanic cones
Volcanic landforms